Mbuk is an Eastern Beboid language of Cameroon.

Notes

References

Beboid languages
Languages of Cameroon